Room acoustics is a subfield of acoustics dealing with the behaviour of sound in enclosed or partially-enclosed spaces. The architectural details of a room influences the behaviour of sound waves within it, with the effects varying by  frequency. Acoustic reflection, diffraction, and  diffusion can combine to create audible phenomena such as  room modes and  standing waves at specific frequencies and locations,  echos, and unique reverberation patterns.

Frequency zones
The way that sound behaves in a room can be broken up into roughly four different frequency zones:
The first zone is below the frequency that has a wavelength of twice the longest length of the room. In this zone, sound behaves very much like changes in static air pressure.
Above that zone, until wavelengths are comparable to the dimensions of the room, room resonances dominate. This transition frequency is popularly known as the Schroeder frequency, or the cross-over frequency and it differentiates the low frequencies which create standing waves within small rooms from the mid and high frequencies.
The third region which extends approximately 2 octaves is a transition to the fourth zone.
In the fourth zone, sounds behave like rays of light bouncing around the room.

Natural modes

For frequencies under the Schroeder frequency, certain wavelengths of sound will build up as resonances within the boundaries of the room, and the resonating frequencies can be determined using the room's dimensions. Similar to the calculation of standing waves inside a pipe with two closed ends, the modal frequencies  and the sound pressure of those modes at a particular position  of a rectilinear room can be defined as 

  

Modes can occur in all three dimensions of a room. Axial modes are one-dimensional, and build up between one set of parallel walls. Tangential modes are two-dimensional, and involve four walls bounding the space perpendicular to each other. Finally, oblique modes concern all walls within the simplified rectilinear room. 

A modal density analysis method using concepts from psychoacoustics, the "Bonello criterion", analyzes the first 48 room modes and plots the number of modes in each one-third of an octave. The curve increases monotonically (each one-third of an octave must have more modes than the preceding one). Other systems to determine correct room ratios have more recently been developed.

Reverberation of the room
After determining the best dimensions of the room, using the modal density criteria, the next step is to find the correct reverberation time.  The most appropriate reverberation time depends on the use of the room. Times about 1.5 to 2 seconds are needed for opera theaters and concert halls. For broadcasting and recording studios and conference rooms, values under one second are frequently used. The recommended reverberation time is always a function of the volume of the room. Several authors give their recommendations  A good approximation for broadcasting  studios and conference rooms is:
TR[1 kHz] = [0.4 log (V+62)] – 0.38 seconds, 
with V=volume of the room in m3. Ideally, the RT60 should have about the same value at all frequencies from 30 to 12,000 Hz. 

To get the desired RT60, several acoustics materials can be used as described in several books.  A valuable simplification of the task was proposed by Oscar Bonello in 1979. It consists of using standard acoustic panels of 1 m2 hung from the walls of the room (only if the panels are parallel). These panels use a combination of three  Helmholtz resonators and a wooden resonant panel. This system gives a large acoustic absorption at low frequencies (under 500 Hz) and reduces at high frequencies to compensate for the typical absorption by people, lateral surfaces, ceilings, etc.

Acoustic space is an acoustic environment in which sound can be heard by an observer. The term acoustic space was first mentioned by Marshall McLuhan, a professor and a philosopher.

Nature of acoustics 
In reality, there are some properties of acoustics that affect the acoustic space. These properties can either improve the quality of the sound or interfere with the sound.
 Reflection is the change in direction of a wave when it hits an object. Many acoustic engineers took advantage from this. It is used for interior designs, either use reflections for benefits or eliminates the reflections. The sound waves usually reflect off the wall and interfere with other sound waves that are generated later. To prevent sound waves reflecting directly to the receiver, a diffusor is introduced. A diffusor has different depths in it, causing the sound to scatter in random directions evenly. It changes the disturbing echo of the sound into a mild reverb which decays over time.
 Diffraction is the change of a sound wave's propagation to avoid obstacles. According to Huygens’ principle, when a sound wave is partially blocked by an obstacle, the remaining part that gets through acts as a source of secondary waves. For instance, if a person is in a room and shouts with the door open, the people on either side of the hallway will hear it. The sound waves that left the door become a source then spread out in the hallway. The sounds from the surroundings might interfere with the acoustic space like the example given.

Uses of acoustic space 
The application of acoustic space is very useful in architecture. Some kinds of architecture need a proficient design to bring out the best performances. For example, concert halls, auditoriums, theaters, or even cathedrals.
 Concert Hall – a place that is designed to hold a concert. A good concert hall usually holds around 1700 to 2600 audience. There are three main attributes of a good concert halls: clarity, ambiance, and loudness. If the seats are well positioned, the audiences will hear clear sound from every single seat. For more ambiance, reverberation times are designed as preferred. For instance, romantic music usually requires an amount of reverberation time to enhance the emotions, therefore, the ceilings of the concert hall should be high. 
 Theater – a place that is designed for live performances. The first priority for sound design in a theater is speech. Speech has to be heard clearly, even if it is a soft whisper. The reverb is not needed in this case, it interrupts the words spoken by the actors. The intensity has to be increased, in order to enlarge the acoustic space, to cover the theater without disrupting the dynamic. In large theaters, amplification must be used. 

 Cathedral (and church) have an area called a choir, usually located near the transept, where the tower is located in most cathedrals. The choir is for the choir to sing. This kind of singing needs a soft cloudy sound for ambiance and emotion. The height of the cathedral does not only show religious pride but also improves the acoustics. There is more reverb when the source generates a sound in the space

See also
Acoustic board
Acoustics
Anechoic room
Architectural acoustics
Digital room correction
Noise control
Sound proofing
Whispering gallery

Notes

References

Acoustics
Building engineering